Halovibrio variabilis is a Gram-negative, aerobic, mesophilic and heterotrophic bacterium from the genus of Halovibrio.

References

Oceanospirillales
Bacteria described in 1989